Armor is a hamlet in the towns of Hamburg and Orchard Park in Erie County, New York, United States.

References

Hamlets in New York (state)
Hamlets in Erie County, New York